Scrotal arteries may refer to:

 Anterior scrotal arteries, branches of the deep external pudendal artery
 Posterior scrotal arteries, branches of the internal pudendal artery